Two Establishes and Two Safeguards are two political slogans promoted by the Chinese Communist Party (CCP) to reinforce CCP general secretary Xi Jinping's rule. According to the CCP historical resolution, the Two Establishes are:

 "To establish the status of Comrade Xi Jinping as the core of the Party’s Central Committee and of the whole Party"
 "To establish the guiding role of Xi Jinping Thought on Socialism with Chinese Characteristics for the New Era"

According to the Sixth Plenum of the 19th Central Committee of the CCP, the Two Safeguards are:

 "Safeguard the 'core' status of General Secretary Xi Jinping within the CCP"
 "To safeguard the centralized authority of the Party"
During the 20th National Congress of the CCP, the Two Safeguards was added to the CCP Constitution.

See also 
 Xi Jinping Administration
 Xi Jinping Thought
 Xi Jinping's cult of personality
 Ideology of the Chinese Communist Party

References 

Xi Jinping Thought
2021 in China